The Trentino-Alto Adige/Südtirol regional election of 1956 took place on 11 November 1956.

The Christian Democracy and the South Tyrolean People's Party won again.

Results

Regional Council

Source: Trentino-Alto Adige/Südtirol Region

Trentino

Source: Trentino-Alto Adige/Südtirol Region

South Tyrol

Source: Trentino-Alto Adige/Südtirol Region

Elections in Trentino-Alto Adige/Südtirol
1956 elections in Italy